Mark Jacobs may refer to:

 Mark Jacobs (game designer), former CEO of Mythic Entertainment
 Mark Jacobs (Blue Heelers), character on the Australian television show Blue Heelers
 Mark Jacobs (author) (born 1951), foreign service officer

See also
 Marc Jacobs (born 1963), fashion designer
 Mark Jacobson (disambiguation) disambiguation